Shuangbai Road is a metro station on the Line 15 of the Shanghai Metro. Located at the intersection of Shuangbai Road and South Lianhua Road in Minhang District, Shanghai, the station was scheduled to open with the rest of Line 15 in 2020. However, the station eventually opened on 23 January 2021 following a one-month postponement. Since Dec. 30, 2021, this station has become the terminal station of short-route trains, in place of West Huajing station.

References 

Railway stations in Shanghai
Shanghai Metro stations in Minhang District
Line 15, Shanghai Metro
Railway stations in China opened in 2021